Dax Randall Shepard (born January 2, 1975) is an American actor, comedian, filmmaker and podcast host. Since 2018, he has hosted Armchair Expert, a podcast that interviews celebrities, journalists, and academics about their lives.

Shepard has appeared in the feature films Without a Paddle (2004), Zathura: A Space Adventure (2005), Employee of the Month (2006), Idiocracy (2006), Let's Go to Prison (2006), Hit and Run (2012), and CHiPs (2017), the last two of which he also wrote and directed. Shepard portrayed Crosby Braverman in the NBC comedy-drama series Parenthood from 2010 to 2015. He also played Luke Matthews in the Netflix show The Ranch, co-starred in ABC's Bless This Mess and acted in the MTV practical joke reality series Punk'd (2003).

He is also a co-founder of the diaper and baby product company Hello Bello with his wife, Kristen Bell.

Early life and education 
Shepard was born in Highland Township, Michigan, in suburban   Detroit. He is the son of Laura LaBo, who worked at General Motors (GM), and David Robert "Dave" Shepard Sr., who was a car salesman. His parents divorced when he was 3 years old.

Shepard's mother developed a substantial business by the time he was in high school. She worked car shows with traveling events at race tracks. She started as a janitor on the midnight shift at GM, then worked in fleet management at the GM proving grounds in Milford, Michigan, then hosted hospitality days for all the GM family members, eventually moving into public relations at an ad agency. She went back to GM, becoming the owner of four shops that managed publicity events for magazine journalists. From the age of 14 to 18, Shepard worked for his mother on the road, going from racetrack to racetrack. For about two years, Shepard had a stepfather who was an engineer on the Corvette. Shepard's mother has been married four times; Shepard said he's had three stepfathers.

According to Shepard, his mother named him for the rich playboy Dax (Diogenes Alejandro Xenos), in Harold Robbins' novel The Adventurers. He has an older brother, David Shepard Jr., who lives in Oregon, and a younger half-sister, Carly Hatter, whom he cast in two films: 2012's Hit and Run and 2017's CHiPs. He is also distantly related to George Washington, through marriage, on his mother's side. 

Shepard has said that he was raised in Milford, although he lived in a lot of places in suburban Detroit, growing up primarily in Walled Lake, Michigan. Dax is dyslexic and said it inspired his acting career. He graduated from Walled Lake Central High School in 1993 before enrolling in The Groundlings school. After attending Santa Monica College and West Los Angeles College, Shepard transferred to UCLA, where he graduated magna cum laude with a B.A. in Anthropology. He had a deal with his mother that if he went to college she would pay his rent.

Career 

After a year in Santa Barbara, California, Shepard moved to Los Angeles in 1996. He found out about The Groundlings improv troupe from a friend from Santa Barbara, Kareem Elseify, ended up auditioning (the first time he acted), and took classes while also attending UCLA. After about five years of classes, he got into the Sunday Company of The Groundlings—in a group that included Melissa McCarthy, Fortune Feimster, Tate Taylor and Nat Faxon.

From 2003 onwards, Shepard became known from his work in the improv Candid Camera-type show, Punk'd, with Ashton Kutcher. When the show had its 2012 revival, he continued to appear. Shepard said he auditioned for Punk'd and while doing the pilot became friendly with Kutcher, who arranged for him to get an agent. He had auditioned unsuccessfully for 10 years before landing the role in Punk'd, his first.

In 2004, Shepard starred in the comedy Without a Paddle, alongside Seth Green and Matthew Lillard. Although the film received negative reviews, it was a commercial success that as of 2009 had grossed more than US$65 million worldwide. In 2005, he starred as The Astronaut in Zathura: A Space Adventure, a science fiction adventure fantasy film. In 2006, he appeared with Dane Cook and Jessica Simpson in the comedy Employee of the Month and in Mike Judge's film Idiocracy as the character Frito.

During the same time, Shepard began appearing in more films and landed his first main character role in Let's Go to Prison (2006), alongside Will Arnett and Chi McBride. He also had a main role in the 2008 comedy Baby Mama, starring opposite Tina Fey and Amy Poehler. Shepard wrote the script for the Paramount venture Get 'Em Wet, in which he again appeared with Arnett. In 2010, he wrote, directed and starred in the low-budget satirical mockumentary feature Brother's Justice; the film won an Audience Award at the 2010 Austin Film Festival. He also had a supporting role in the 2010 romantic comedy film When in Rome, which also starred his future wife Kristen Bell.

From 2010 to 2015, Shepard was part of the main cast of the NBC drama Parenthood, playing Crosby Braverman.

Shepard wrote, produced, co-directed, and starred in the 2012 low-budget film Hit and Run alongside Bell and his close friend Bradley Cooper. He said the movie, which includes numerous car chases and fast driving scenes, allowed him to live out his Smokey and the Bandit fantasy.

Shepard had a supporting role in the 2014 film The Judge, which starred Robert Downey Jr., Robert Duvall and Vera Farmiga.

In September 2014, Dax starred with his wife, Kristen Bell, in a commercial for the Samsung Galaxy Tab S. It was so popular (with over 20 million YouTube views) that they did another commercial for the holiday season. The ad agency McKinney was behind both.

Shepard wrote and directed a feature-length film called CHiPs, based on the 1977 to 1983 American crime drama of the same name, where he starred as Officer Jon Baker alongside Michael Peña as Frank "Ponch" Poncherello. The project was released by Warner Bros. on March 24, 2017 to negative reviews.

On February 14, 2018, Shepard launched the podcast Armchair Expert with cohost Monica Padman. The show explores the stories of their well-known guests. Featured guests on the show have included Kristen Bell, Ashton Kutcher, Will Ferrell, and Julia Louis-Dreyfus. On June 7, 2018, the show released their first episode of "Experts on Expert", in which Shepard and Padman interview experts in their fields. Featured experts on the show have included psychologist Wendy Mogel, comedian and author David Sedaris, and speechwriter Jon Favreau. The show was the most popular new podcast on iTunes in 2018. On December 3, 2019, it was revealed that Shepard will be a host of the revived Top Gear America, which premiered on Motor Trend in January 2021.

Personal life

Relationships 

Shepard met actress Kristen Bell, also a native of Detroit's northern suburbs, at the birthday party of a mutual friend; they began dating in late 2007. The couple announced their engagement in January 2010; however, they decided to delay marriage until the state of California passed legislation legalizing same-sex marriage. After section 3 of the Defense of Marriage Act was ruled unconstitutional by the Supreme Court on June 26, 2013, Bell asked Shepard through Twitter to marry her, which he accepted. They were married at the Beverly Hills County Clerk's Office on October 17, 2013. They have two daughters, born in March 2013 and December 2014.

Substance abuse 
Shepard has said that, except for a year in high school when he used drugs, he did not have a substance abuse problem until he was 18 years old. After many struggles, Shepard achieved sobriety in September 2005. On September 25, 2020, in a special episode of his podcast, Armchair Expert, Shepard revealed he had relapsed while recovering from an accident by buying painkillers to augment a prescription. He announced that he was again sober, with seven days of sobriety as of the recording date (September 21, 2020).

Interests and charity work 
Shepard races motorcycles at Buttonwillow Raceway, including his Ducati Hypermotard 1100S and Suzuki GSX-R1000. He donates much of his time to the Hollenbeck Youth Center, an after-school program that provides opportunity to at-risk inner-city youth. He has served as their official Master of Ceremonies, along with his friend Tom Arnold, for the Inner-City Games and Hollenbeck Youth Center's Miracle on 1st Street Toy Giveaway Program in East Los Angeles.

He is an avid car enthusiast and can rebuild an engine. He owns the 1967 Lincoln Continental that was featured in the movie Hit and Run, and races off-road.

Shepard and his wife were advocates of California Senate Bill 606, called "no-kids paparazzi". Bell said: "We're not saying that we can't be newsworthy. We're saying that our child is not newsworthy." California Senate Bill 606 passed in 2013, with testimony by actresses Halle Berry and Jennifer Garner.

Shepard practices the Transcendental Meditation program.

Filmography

Film

Television

Awards and nominations

References

External links 

 

1975 births
Living people
20th-century American male actors
21st-century American male actors
American male film actors
American male television actors
American male screenwriters
American male voice actors
American podcasters
Comedy film directors
Film directors from Michigan
Male actors from Detroit
People from Walled Lake, Michigan
People from Highland, Oakland County, Michigan
Santa Monica College alumni
Screenwriters from Michigan
University of California, Los Angeles alumni
West Los Angeles College alumni
Actors with dyslexia